Blackberry Hill is a Konservat-Lagerstätte of Cambrian age located within the Elk Mound Group in Marathon County, Wisconsin. It is found in a series of quarries and outcrops that are notable for their large concentration of exceptionally preserved trace fossils in Cambrian tidal flats. One quarry in particular also has the distinction of preserving some of the first land animals. These are preserved as three-dimensional casts, which is unusual for Cambrian animals that are only lightly biomineralized. Additionally, Blackberry Hill is the first occurrence recognized to include Cambrian mass strandings of scyphozoans (jellyfish).

Age and stratigraphic placement 
The strata at Blackberry Hill are known to belong to the Elk Mound Group; however, the lack of good stratigraphic markers (i.e., index fossils) in some Blackberry Hill localities, coupled with uncertainties about the age range of the Elk Mound Group itself, make it difficult to assign a precise age to these strata.  Many researchers consider these rocks to be Late Cambrian, which is the age to which the Elk Mound Group was originally assigned; however, some recent authors now believe the Elk Mound Group and the fossils of Blackberry Hill could date back to the Middle Cambrian, based on certain fossils obtained from other areas.

Geological and environmental setting 
Most of the strata are composed of well bedded quartz sandstone and orthoquartzite.  They were deposited mainly on intertidal and supratidal zones of tidal flats of an inland sea of the supercontinent Laurentia.  Ripple marks and numerous other sedimentary structures identical to those found on modern beaches abound on the strata surfaces.  One of the most conspicuous features is extensive areas of specific structures not unlike those associated with modern biofilms and microbial mats.  There is mounting evidence suggesting that the feeding potential of this presumed microbial material was one of the forces that lured the first animals out of the sea.  It is also believed that the same material aided in the exceptional preservation of many of Blackberry Hill's trace fossils.

Significance
Among the many paleontological discoveries thus far made at Blackberry Hill are the following:
The first body fossils, and therefore the identity, of one of the first animals to walk on land.
The only fossils that link those animals with their trackways.
Body fossils of what may be the first phyllocarid with well preserved legs.
Identification of the maker of Protichnites trackways after over 150 years of speculation.
The largest concentrations of fossilized, stranded scyphozoans (i.e., jellyfish).
What may be the first mating behavior in the fossil record.

The largest, most productive quarry is still in operation, thereby revealing fresh surfaces and the potential for new discoveries on a continuing basis.

Biota 
Sedimentary structures associated with biofilms and microbial mats  are the only evidence of non-animal life at Blackberry Hill, as is the case elsewhere in this pre-embryophyte period in the history of Earth's life on land.  The animal life of Blackberry Hill was, however, represented by several kinds of macrofossils, all preserved as three-dimensional casts or impressions, including:
 Mosineia macnaughtoni– These large (up to 10+ cm in length) arthropods, apparently having paddle or oar-like appendages, along with another genus from similar-aged strata of Quebec, have been identified as the oldest euthycarcinoids in the fossil record and some of the first animals to walk on land.  It is thus far known from only three exoskeletons preserved ventral-side-up, all lacking the heads and carapaces.
Arenosicaris inflata–  This smaller arthropod (up to approximately 5 cm in length), more common than Mosineia (over 40 specimens to date), is one of the oldest members of the Phyllocarida. Disarticulated or splayed carapaces have been found in addition to essentially complete exoskeletons; however, the head is poorly known. Limbs, which are rarely fossilized in phyllocarids, are typically preserved in the A. inflata specimens.
Scyphozoan medusae – Most of these are dome-shaped fossils, usually represented as body cavity infillings formed as the stranded animals pumped their bodies in an attempt to escape, and in so doing, ingested sand. Being composed mainly of water, scyphozoans rarely fossilize; however, they are found by the hundreds on some surfaces of one Blackberry Hill quarry.  The size of these fossils is also noteworthy; some specimens have achieved a diameter of 95 cm, making them the largest scyphozoan fossils on record.

Trace fossils 
Protichnites – These trackways (up to 8 cm wide at Blackberry Hill) are characterized by two parallel rows of paired footprints, often in sets, and a medial furrow or series of medial impressions, presumably from a dragging or touching tail.  The maker of Protichnites was conjectural since 1852, when Sir Richard Owen, the pioneering British anatomist and paleontologist who coined the term “dinosauria,” first named and described them based on material from equivalent strata of Quebec.  Fossils from Blackberry Hill named P. eremita, found over 150 years later, solved the mystery by eventually revealing that at least some Protichnites were likely produced by the euthycarcinoid Mosineia macnaughtoni.  P. eremita was originally interpreted to have been the product of an arthropod with the assistance of a mollusk shell that it used in hermit crab-style behavior.
Diplichnites – These trackways at Blackberry Hill often resemble Protichnites, except they lack medial markings. They may have been made by the same animal(s) that produced Protichnites, based on individual trackways having medial furrows that appear and disappear as the animal travelled. It has been suggested that some Diplichnites are undertracks, whereby the animal walked on the top layer of sand, but only the tips of its appendages reached the underlying layer. In these cases, the top layer might then exhibit Protichnites due to the tail that dragged on the surface, and the bottom layer would result in the furrow-less Diplichnites.  It is possible that some Diplichnites were produced by trilobites or unknown arthropods, but no fossils of trilobites have been found thus far at Blackberry Hill.
Climactichnites – These distinctive trace fossils, up to 14 cm in width and resembling tire tracks, are the most conspicuous trails at Blackberry Hill, literally covering large surfaces of certain strata.  Two ichnospecies are found: C. wilsoni, which are surface trails that have lateral ridges; and C. youngi, which are burrows that lack lateral ridges.  Their maker was likely a large, slug-like mollusk.  Occasionally the resting trace, Musculopodus, is found at one end of a C. wilsoni.  It has been speculated that the animal may have remained burrowed in the sediment in the daytime to avoid desiccation from the sunlight, and emerged at night to feed on the near-shore and on-shore microbial mats; however, there is no direct fossil evidence of grazing at Blackberry Hill, such as fossilized fecal pellets or strands.
Other trace fossils – A variety of less conspicuous trace fossils is common at Blackberry Hill.  The resting trace Rusophycus, bilobate linear traces similar to Cruziana and Aulichnites, and ropelike traces are sometimes found in close association with Arenosicaris inflata and are believed to result mainly from the burrowing activity of that phyllocarid.

References

Further reading

External links 

Blackberry Hill fossils
Provides a discussion of Blackberry Hill fossils, as one of Paleontology Portal’s “Famous Flora and Fauna” pages.

Cambrian paleontological sites
Geology of Wisconsin
Lagerstätten
Paleontology in Wisconsin
Paleozoic paleontological sites of North America